OSEC can stand for:
Occupy the SEC
Former name of Enefit American Oil (former name: Oil Shale Exploration Company - OSEC)